The 25th Arabian Gulf Cup is an international football tournament held in Iraq from 6 to 19 January 2023. The 8 national teams involved in the tournament were required to register a squad with a minimum of 18 players and a maximum of 23 players, at least three of whom must be goalkeepers. Only players in these squads are eligible to take part in the tournament.

The age listed for each player is as of 6 January 2023, the first day of the tournament. The numbers of caps and goals listed for each player do not include any matches played after the start of the tournament. The nationality for each club reflects the national association (not the league) to which the club is affiliated. A flag is included for coaches that are of a different nationality than their own national team.

Group A

Iraq
Coach:  Jesús Casas

Iraq announced a 35-man preliminary squad on 7 December 2022. Their final 23-man squad was announced on 24 December 2022. Ali Ebadi and Ahmed Farhan were added to the squad on 26 December 2022. Ahmed Yasin withdrew from the squad on 29 December 2022. On 31 December 2022, Ayman Hussein and Amjad Attwan were added to the squad. The final squad was announced on 5 January 2023.

Oman
Coach:  Branko Ivankovic

Oman announced their final squad on 1 January 2023.

Saudi Arabia
Coach: Saad Al-Shehri

Saudi Arabia announced their squad on 30 December 2022.

Yemen

Coach:  Miroslav Soukup

Yemen announced their squad on 31 December 2022.
Yemen announced their final squad on 6 January 2023.

Group B

Bahrain
Coach:  Hélio Sousa

Bahrain announced their squad on 26 December 2022.

Kuwait
Coach:  Rui Bento

Kuwait announced their preliminary squad on 22 December 2022. On 1 January 2023, Kuwait announced their final squad.

Qatar
Coach:  Bruno Pinheiro

Qatar announced their preliminary squad on 12 December 2022. On 20 December 2022, Ahmed Alaaeldin was added to the squad. On 3 January, the final squad was announced.

United Arab Emirates
Coach:  Rodolfo Arruabarrena

United Arab Emirates announced their preliminary squad on 23 December 2022. The final squad was announced on 25 December 2022. On 26 December, Shahin Abdulrahman withdrew from the squad due to injury. On 27 December, Tahnoon Al-Zaabi withdrew from the squad due to injury as well.

References

External links
 Official site

squads